Elizabeth Castro, sometimes known as Liz Castro, is an American author and translator best known for her books aimed to educate the reader on particular aspects of website development, such as HTML and Perl. From 1987 to 1993 Castro lived in Barcelona and managed the translation of computer programs. In 1993 she moved back to the United States to write books about using the internet and World Wide Web.

Currently based in Barcelona, she has also been active in the Catalan independence movement, promoting the cause in the English language sphere with her latest and most notable project being What's up with Catalonia?, with authors like Josep Maria Ganyet, among many others.

On May 9, 2015, she was the most voted candidate in the elections to the National Secretary of the Catalan National Assembly, the grassroots movement for Catalan independence, and currently is its International Committee Chair.

Publications

Books
As of 2010, all of her English language books have been published through Peachpit Press, in their 'Visual Quickstart Guide' or 'Visual Quickproject Guide' formats. These books give example code and illustrations followed by explanations designed to teach related concepts.

HTML
 
 
 
 
 
 
 
 
 
 

Netscape
 
 
 
 
 
 

Perl and CGI
 
 

XML
 

Blogger
 
 

iPhoto
 

EPUB
 
 
Castro continues to release miniguide updates to her well-received EPUB guide.

Matthew Diener, editor of EPUBsecrets reviewed her fourth miniguide, praising how Castro takes the reader through the steps to make the "conversion to ePUB easier and better." He lists ways that this miniguide aids users in placement and insertion of images and media, as well as preparing ePUBS to be used for Kindle editions. Diener also is pleased that the miniguides are "DRM free. This means you can actually "crack these ePUBs" and take a look at the files that make up her books. This will allow you to see everything she does to make her ePUBs appear the way they do."
Joel Friedlander in The Book Designer said, "Liz Castro has cracked the code on creating beautiful, functional ebooks...Liz Castro's EPUB Straight to the Point is a fantastic resource with clear instruction and should be in the ereader of anyone whose work involves dealing with EPUB and iBooks."
Adam C. Engst, Contributing Editor at MacUser, MacWEEK, and Macworld, in his e-newsletter TidBITS called Castro's site for iPhoto book themes "a wonderfully useful Web site".

Politics
 

Other

Awards

From Òmnium Cultural, Dec 16, 2011:
The jury of the 25th Joan B. Cendrós Prize has awarded the prize for her work about Catalonia published outside of Catalonia to the American publisher Liz Castro. Castro, a writer living in Massachusetts, has become known in the last few years for her work promoting Catalonia and talking about its linguistic, cultural, and political situation through her publishing house, Catalonia Press, as well as the internet, where she reports on Catalan news in English. In 2014 she received one of the Batista i Roca Award - Enric Garriga Trullols Memorial, granted by the Institut de Projecció Exterior de la Cultura Catalana.

References

External links
 Official web site

American technology writers
American women bloggers
American bloggers
People from Barcelona
Living people
Catalan independence movement
Women technology writers
American women non-fiction writers
21st-century American non-fiction writers
Year of birth missing (living people)
21st-century American women writers